The 16th Vanier Cup was played on November 29, 1980, at Varsity Stadium in Toronto, Ontario, and decided the CIAU football champion for the 1980 season. The Alberta Golden Bears won their third championship by defeating the Ottawa Gee-Gees by a score of 40-21.

References

External links
 Official website

Vanier Cup
Vanier Cup
1980 in Toronto
November 1980 sports events in Canada